"You Go First (Do You Wanna Kiss)" is a song recorded by American country music artist Jessica Andrews.  It was released in July 1999 as the second single from the album Heart Shaped World.  The song reached #25 on the Billboard Hot Country Singles & Tracks chart.  The song was written by Kerry Chater, Lynn Gillespie Chater and Cyril Rawson.

Chart performance

References

1999 singles
1999 songs
Jessica Andrews songs
Songs written by Kerry Chater
Song recordings produced by Byron Gallimore
DreamWorks Records singles